Doryssa consolidata is a species of freshwater snail with an operculum, an aquatic gastropod mollusk in the family Pachychilidae.

Distribution 
This species occurs in the South America:
 Venezuela
 Guyana

References

consolidata
Gastropods described in 1790
Molluscs of Venezuela
Invertebrates of Guyana